Wesolowskana lymphatica is a species of jumping spiders of the family Salticidae. It is endemic in Cape Verde. The species was first described as Luxuria lymphatica by Wesołowska in 1989. It was renamed in 2008, because the genus Luxuria was already in use for a genus of molluscs.

Description
The cephalothorax of the female holotype measures 2.5–2.7 mm, and the abdomen 2.6–3.3 mm.

References

External links
 Diagnostic drawings of W. lymphatica

Salticidae
Spiders of Africa
Spiders described in 1989
Taxa named by Wanda Wesołowska
Arthropods of Cape Verde
Endemic fauna of Cape Verde